Hollywood, Virginia may refer to:
Hollywood, Appomattox County, Virginia
Hollywood, Pittsylvania County, Virginia